Tau Virginis (τ Vir, τ Virginis) is a single star in the zodiac constellation Virgo. With an apparent visual magnitude of 4.28, it is faintly visible to the naked eye. The distance to Tau Virginis, based upon parallax measurements, is approximately 225 light years with a margin of error of ±3 light years.

This star has a stellar classification of A2IV/V, which matches the spectrum of an A-type main sequence star mixed with spectral traits of a subgiant. It is about 700 million years old and is spinning rapidly with a projected rotational velocity of 186 km/s. The star has nearly double the mass of the Sun and about 160% of the Sun's radius. It shines with 70 times the luminosity of the Sun and has an effective temperature of 8413 K in its outer atmosphere.

Tau Virginis has multiple visual companions, listed below:

References

A-type main-sequence stars
Virgo (constellation)
Virginis, Tau
Virginis, 093
122408
068520
5264
Durchmusterung objects
A-type subgiants